Braafheid is a surname. Notable people with the surname include:

Anne Marie Braafheid, Miss Universe contestant
Edson Braafheid (born 1983), Dutch footballer